Kariz Kohandel (also Romanized as Kārīz Kohandel; also known as Kārīz Kondel) is a village in Jannatabad Rural District, Salehabad County, Razavi Khorasan Province, Iran. At the 2006 census, its population was 1,593, in 338 families.

References 

Populated places in   Torbat-e Jam County